Rughidia cordatum is a species of flowering plant in the family Apiaceae.
It is endemic to Yemen.
Its natural habitat is subtropical or tropical dry forests.

References

cordatum
Endemic flora of Socotra
Least concern plants
Taxonomy articles created by Polbot